The Commonwealth Line was a shipping company owned and operated by the Australian federal government between 1916 and 1928. It was officially known as the Commonwealth Government Line of Steamers until 1923, and thereafter as the Australian Commonwealth Line of Steamers.

History
The Commonwealth Line began as a pet project of Prime Minister Billy Hughes. While visiting England in mid-1916, Hughes purchased 15 tramp steamers to transport Australian commodities (particular wool and wheat) to export markets. This was a risky venture, as the British government had the right to requisition some or all of the fleet for the war effort. However, Hughes managed to convince H. H. Asquith not to take any of the vessels, so long as no more were purchased before the end of the war. Back in Australia, another 23 ships came under the new company's control, which had been seized by the government from German and Austrian owners.

After the war's end, the Commonwealth Line built five large ocean liners to carry immigrants from England. By 1921, the company was making only a small profit each year and was often a target for industrial action. In 1923, Hughes was replaced as prime minister by Stanley Bruce, who opposed the government's ownership of the line as a financial burden and an unfair competitor against private operators. The Bruce regime sold off the fleet over the next few years, culminating in a final sale to the White Star Line in 1928. They were later onsold to the Aberdeen Line, which renamed itself the Aberdeen & Commonwealth Line. On paper the fleet was valued at around £8 million, but the government received only £500,000 due to the buyer defaulting.

In the final parliamentary vote to approve the sale, the entire Labor Party voted against and were joined by only non-Labor members, Percy Stewart and William Watson. Billy Hughes absented himself from the vote. In the prior debate, he described the line as "my progeny, and whether it be unique or a monstrosity, I, like most parents, am still attached to the poor thing ... I am present at the obsequies of the Line, as I was at its birth".

Ships
The fleet of ships that were operated included requisitioned sailing ships

See also
 Australian National Line, a similar government-owned corporation formed in 1956

References

Australian companies established in 1916
1928 establishments in Australia
Defunct shipping companies of Australia
Former Commonwealth Government-owned companies of Australia
Government-owned transport companies
1928 disestablishments in Australia